The South African Railways Class 8Y 2-8-0 of 1903 was a steam locomotive from the pre-Union era in the Cape of Good Hope.

In 1903, the Cape Government Railways placed four more Cape 8th Class  Consolidation type steam locomotives in service. In 1912, when they were assimilated into the South African Railways, they were renumbered and designated Class 8Y.

Manufacturer
The first locomotive in the Cape Government Railways (CGR)  Consolidation type 8th Class, later to be designated the South African Railways (SAR) Class 8X, was designed by H.M. Beatty, the CGR’s Chief Locomotive Superintendent from 1896 to 1910. This second batch of four engines was ordered in 1903 from Kitson and Company of Hunslet in Leeds, West Yorkshire. All four were allocated to the CGR’s Western System and numbered in the range from 817 to 820.

These engines also used saturated steam and cylinders with overhead slide valves, actuated by inside Stephenson valve gear.

Class 8 sub-classes
In spite of the difference in wheel arrangement, the CGR grouped its  Consolidation and post-7th Class  Mastodon locomotives together as the 8th Class.

When the Union of South Africa was established on 31 May 1910, the three Colonial government railways (CGR, Natal Government Railways and Central South African Railways) were united under a single administration to control and administer the railways, ports and harbours of the Union. Although the South African Railways and Harbours came into existence in 1910, the actual classification and renumbering of all the rolling stock of the three constituent railways were only implemented with effect from 1 January 1912.

In 1912, these four locomotives were designated Class 8Y on the South African Railways (SAR) and renumbered in the range from 896 to 899. All the CGR 8th Class  and  locomotives, together with the Classes  to   Mastodon locomotives from the Central South African Railways (CSAR), were grouped into ten different sub-classes by the SAR. The  locomotives became SAR Classes 8 and 8A to 8F and the  locomotives became Classes 8X to 8Z.

Service
In SAR service, the  Class 8Y was used mainly in the Northern Cape until they were withdrawn by 1938.

References

1610
1610
2-8-0 locomotives
1D locomotives
Kitson locomotives
Cape gauge railway locomotives 
Railway locomotives introduced in 1903
1903 in South Africa
Scrapped locomotives